Transtillaspis golondrinana is a species of moth of the family Tortricidae. It is found in Carchi Province, Ecuador.

The wingspan is about 18 mm. The ground colour of the forewings is pale greyish brown with brownish suffusions in the basal and apical areas of the wing. The dots are brown and blackish and the markings are brownish. The hindwings are brownish cream with a slight grey admixture, greyer strigulae (fine streaks) and brown dots on the periphery.

Etymology
The species name refers to Golondrinas, the type locality.

References

Moths described in 2008
Transtillaspis
Taxa named by Józef Razowski